Ammentorp is a surname. Notable people with the surname include:

Johan Ammentorp (1860–1931), Danish medical doctor
Kjeld Ammentorp (1895–1975), British businessman

See also
Christian Ditlev Ammentorp Hansen (1843–1916), Danish pharmacist and industrialist